Hans-Jürgen Gede (born 14 November 1956) is a German football coach and former player.

Playing career
Born in Gelsenkirchen, Gede began playing football for FC Schalke 04 in 1975. In 1977, he joined SC Preußen Münster and after playing 71 times for club, he left Preußen and joined SC Fortuna Köln. He made 344 appearances for Fortuna Köln and scored 48 goals. He retired in 1991.

Coaching career
Gede was appointed as head coach of Fortuna Düsseldorf in 1991, just months after his retirement from playing. He signed with Iranian side Persepolis in 1994, beginning a successful tenure. After about three months in Persepolis, he was appointed as head coach of the Iran national under-23 football team in June 1994 to lead the team to qualification for the 1996 Summer Olympics, but failed. After that, he coached at KSV Hessen Kassel, SV Lippstadt 08 and Rot-Weiß Oberhausen. In 2004, he was appointed as assistant coach of the Uzbekistan national football team and became their head coach in 2005, coaching the team in two matches. In 2005, he returned to Iran and managed Shahid Ghandi in the Azadegan League. Al-Ahli Manama, Kuala Lumpur FA, Neftchi Baku, Okktha United FC and Tahaddy Benghazi were his next teams. During the 2010–11 Persian Gulf Cup, he was the assistant coach to Parviz Mazloomi in Esteghlal. On 1 June 2011, he was appointed as the assistant coach of Zob Ahan. On 20 June 2016, he was appointed as a technical director of the Vietnam national team. On 10 August 2020, he was appointed as the technical director of Viettel.

External links

References

Living people
1956 births
Sportspeople from Gelsenkirchen
German football managers
German expatriate football managers
FC Schalke 04 players
SC Fortuna Köln players
Bundesliga players
2. Bundesliga players
Fortuna Düsseldorf managers
KSV Hessen Kassel managers
Persepolis F.C. managers
Al-Ahli Club Manama managers
Expatriate football managers in Iran
Expatriate football managers in Uzbekistan
Uzbekistan national football team managers
Expatriate football managers in Bahrain
Expatriate football managers in Malaysia
Expatriate football managers in Myanmar
Expatriate football managers in Libya
Expatriate football managers in Azerbaijan
Association football midfielders
Footballers from North Rhine-Westphalia
German footballers
Aluminium Hormozgan F.C. managers